Gresham Castle is located south of the village of Gresham in the north of the English county of Norfolk. The medieval castle was actually a fortified manor house.

Permission by licence to crenellate his manor house was gained by Sir Edmund Bacon in 1318. Gresham was one of a group of late castles to be fortified or built along the east coast that include Baconsthorpe, Caister, Claxton and Mettingham Castle in Suffolk.

Description
The castle is situated in a green field site close to the village. It is rectangular in shape with a bulbous protrusion at the north-west corner. A moat surrounding the site is twelve to fifteen feet wide at points and still contains water which can restrict access to the site. The waters of the moat were once supplied from Gur Beck which now has been re-directed and runs approximately 50 meters adjacent to the remains of the castle. The central platform is approximately 2378 square meters (2844 square yards) in area, with round towers 35 feet in diameter. It is very overgrown with trees, bushes and brambles, making an overview of the castle very difficult. The tower that stood at the south-east angle is forward of the platform line. The revetments of the two corner towers on the west elevation can be seen, of which one is much larger than the other. Between them part of the curtain wall still stands to about six feet. The footprint of the site indicates that there were towers on the east side as well, with the one at the north west angle being the size of a keep. Large timbers, presumed to be what remained of a drawbridge, an entrance to a passage, and the keel of a boat were discovered when the surrounding moat was cleaned out in 1846.

History
In 1427 the castle and manor of Gresham was purchased by the lawyer William Paston to add to his already large property holdings in Norfolk. Paston purchased the castle and manor from Thomas Chaucer of Ewelme and Sir William Moleyns, who each owned half of the property. However, the legality of the purchase was challenged by the Wiltshire peer, Robert Hungerford, Lord Moleyns, 2nd Baron Hungerford. Consequently, when William Paston died he left a large and valuable inheritance including Gresham Castle to his son John Paston. Lord Moleyns' longstanding claim to half of the property was encouraged by John Paston's bitter rival John Haydon of nearby Baconsthorpe Castle. On 17 February 1448 forces led by Lord Moleyns took direct action and entered the fortified manor house and began to collect rent from the tenants of the manor. After these actions, John Paston petitioned the king, and after his appeals Paston reclaimed his property on 6 October. On 28 January, Moleyns with a force of a one thousand men made up of some locals and retainers from Wiltshire, occupied the castle once more this time forcible evicting John Paston's wife Margaret and twelve of her servants. A lieutenant of Moleyns by the name of Partridge was left to barricade the castle against any attempt by Paston to reclaim his property. In the Paston Letters Margaret explains to her husband John:

One year later John Paston reclaimed the castle and manor, this time with no resistance. He found that the castle was in a very poor state and unfit for habitation. In 1466 John Paston died leaving his estate which included Gresham to his eldest son, also called John. In 1471 Sir John Gresham contemplated the rebuilding of Gresham Castle and sent his brother, also called John, to survey the site and draw up plans for a rebuilding. In the event no rebuilding was carried out and the site was abandoned.

See also
Castles in Great Britain and Ireland
List of castles in England

References

Archaeology of Norfolk
Castles in Norfolk
English Heritage sites in Norfolk
Ruins in Norfolk
Grade II listed buildings in Norfolk
North Norfolk
Country houses in Norfolk